This is a compilation of functioning bells in Boston, Massachusetts, located primarily in bell towers.

 Church of the Advent
 Faneuil Hall. The bell was repaired in 2007 by spraying the frozen clapper with WD-40 over the course of a week and attaching a rope. Prior to this repair, the last known ringing of the bell with its clapper was at the end of World War II, in 1945, though it had since been rung several times by striking with a mallet.
 King's Chapel. The King's Chapel bell, cast in England, was hung in 1772. In 1814 it cracked, was recast by Paul Revere, and was rehung. It is the largest bell cast by the Revere foundry, and the last one cast by Paul Revere himself. It has been rung at services ever since.
 Old North Church. Eight change ringing bells at Old North Church were cast in Gloucester, England in 1744 and hung in 1745.  One bell has the inscription: We are the first ring of bells cast for the British Empire in North America, A.R. 1744.(Abel Rudhall, Bell Founder, Gloucester 1714-1760)  The bells were restored in 1894 and in 1975.  They are maintained and rung regularly by the Massachusetts Institute of Technology Guild of Bellringers.
 Old South Church
 Old South Meeting House Old South Meeting House now is home to a Paul Revere bell, cast in 1801. The bell was installed in 2011 
Arlington Street Church

See also
 Acoustic ecology
 Environmental noise
 Soundscape

References

Further reading

External links

 Flickr. Filene's four-bell carillion that chimes the hour. 2005
 Flickr. Bell on the USS Constitution in Boston Harbor, 2006. 2008
 Flickr. Bell Ringing Room of the Old North Church in Boston, 2006
 Flickr. "In the belfry of St. Stephen's Church on Hanover Street in Boston's North End, designed by architect Charles Bulfinch. The bell in the belfry is said to have been cast by Paul Revere." 2009

Boston-related lists
Boston
Culture of Boston
Buildings and structures in Boston
Boston
Boston
American music-related lists